Hugo José Rama Calviño (born 22 November 1996) is a Spanish professional footballer who plays as a central midfielder for Real Oviedo.

Club career
Born in Sigüeiro, Oroso, A Coruña, Galicia, Rama represented Celta de Vigo and ED Xuventude Oroso as a youth. He made his senior debut with hometown side Sigüeiro FC on 7 September 2014, starting and scoring the equalizer in a 1–2 home loss against Cordeiro FC for the Primera Autonómica championship.

Rama subsequently moved to Deportivo de La Coruña; initially assigned to the youth setup, he featured sparingly with the reserves in Tercera División. In August 2017, he joined Segunda División B side CCD Cerceda.

On 25 January 2018, Rama signed a contract with CD Lugo, effective as of 1 July. On 7 August, however, he was loaned to third division side CD Mirandés for one year.

Rama was an undisputed starter for the Castilian-Leonese side, scoring a career-best six goals as the club achieved promotion to the second division, but suffering a serious knee injury in the play-offs. On 24 July, he extended his contract with Lugo until 2022.

Rama was declared fit to play only in January 2020, and made his professional debut on 15 January by coming on as a second-half substitute for Álex López in a 0–1 away loss against Rayo Vallecano.

Rama scored his first professional goal on 21 October 2020, netting his team's second in a 3–0 home win over Girona FC. On 31 January 2022, he left Lugo on a mutual agreement, and signed a two-and-a-half-year deal with fellow second division side Real Oviedo just hours later.

References

External links

1996 births
Living people
People from Ordes (comarca)
Sportspeople from the Province of A Coruña
Spanish footballers
Footballers from Galicia (Spain)
Association football midfielders
Segunda División players
Segunda División B players
Tercera División players
Divisiones Regionales de Fútbol players
Deportivo Fabril players
CD Lugo players
CD Mirandés footballers
Real Oviedo players